Mikołaj Firlej may refer to several members of the Firlej family:

 Mikołaj Firlej (?–1526), hetman, voiode of Sandomierz (wojewoda sandomierski)
 Mikołaj Firlej (?–1588), voivode of Lublin (wojewoda lubelski)
 Mikołaj Firlej (?–1601), voivode of Kraków (wojewoda krakowski), Grand Marshal of the Crown
 Mikołaj Firlej (1588–1635), voivode of Sandomierz (wojewoda sandomierski)